Group A of the 2010 Fed Cup Asia/Oceania Zone Group I was one of two pools in the Asia/Oceania Zone Group I of the 2010 Fed Cup. Four teams competed in a round robin competition, with the top team and the bottom two teams proceeding to their respective sections of the play-offs: the top teams played for advancement to the World Group II Play-offs, while the bottom teams faced potential relegation to Group II.

Japan vs. Indonesia

New Zealand vs. South Korea

Japan vs. New Zealand

Indonesia vs. South Korea

Japan vs. South Korea

New Zealand vs. Indonesia

See also
Fed Cup structure

References

External links
 Fed Cup website

2010 Fed Cup Asia/Oceania Zone